Abu Abdullah `Ubaidullah bin Muhammad bin Battah al-`Ukbari al-Hanbali, known as Ibn Battah was a Hanbali theologian and jurisconsult born at 'Ukbara
in 304/c. 917. He learned from a number of Hanbali scholars of his time and also personally knew al-Barbahari.

Ibn Batta was severely attacked by Khatib al-Baghdadi, a former Hanbali though he was defended by Ibn al-Jawzi who was much influenced by him.

Books
 Al-Ibāna (Al-Kubra/Al-Sugra); Kitab al-sharh wa al-ibanah ala usul al-sunnah wa al-dinayah. in Henry Laoust, La Profession de foi d'Ibn Batta. Damascus: Institut Francais de Damas, 1958.
 Al-Sunna
 Al-Manāsik
 Taḥrīm al-Namīma
 Ibṭāl al-Ḥiyal

See also  
Hanbali Scholars

References

External links
 Ibn Baṭṭa, ʿUbayd Allāh b. Muḥammad Abū ʿAbd Allāh al-ʿUkbari / Laoust, H. // Encyclopaedia of Islam. 2 ed. — Leiden : E. J. Brill, 1960–2005.

910s births
997 deaths
People from Baghdad
Hanbalis
Sunni Muslim scholars of Islam
Hadith scholars
10th-century Muslim scholars of Islam
10th-century jurists